Sonia Guadalupe Zepeda Cortéz (born 26 January 1981) is a Salvadoran chess player. Zepeda was taught to play chess by her father Rafael Zepeda (peak Elo rating 2069). Her younger sister Lorena Zepeda is also a chess player. Sonia Zepeda was trained by International Master .

She has won the Salvadoran Women's Chess Championship 5 times (1997, 1998, 1999, 2000 and 2009) and has won the Central American Women's Chess Championship twice. She has been a part of the El Salvador national chess team for four Olympics.

References

External links
 

1981 births
Living people
Salvadoran female chess players
Sportspeople from San Salvador
Chess Woman International Masters